Roger Gustafsson (born 29 February 1952, in Gothenburg) is a former Swedish football player and manager. He has played in the highest Swedish league, Allsvenskan, with GAIS, but is better known as the best performing manager in Allsvenskan ever, having won five Swedish championships with IFK Göteborg. He also took the club to the Champions League group stage twice and the quarter-finals of the same tournament once. He is still active in the club as leader of the youth section.

Achievements 

 Swedish championships (5): 1990, 1991, 1993, 1994, 1995
 Swedish cup wins (1): 1990–91
 Champions League (2): group stage 1992–93, quarter-finals 1994–95

References

1952 births
Living people
Swedish footballers
GAIS players
BK Häcken players
Swedish football managers
IFK Göteborg managers
IFK Göteborg non-playing staff
Association football defenders
Footballers from Gothenburg